Swede Heaven is a census-designated place (CDP) in Snohomish County, Washington, United States. The population was 768 at the 2010 census.

Geography
Swede Heaven is located at  (48.280667, -121.709853).

According to the United States Census Bureau, the CDP has a total area of 7.014 square miles (18.17 km), of which 7.007 square miles (18.15 km) is land and 0.007 square miles (0.02 km) (0.10%) is water.

References 

Census-designated places in Washington (state)
Census-designated places in Snohomish County, Washington